is a style of Okinawan Karate founded by Juhatsu Kyoda.

 entered the dojo of Higaonna Kanryō in 1902 and continued studying with him until Kanryō's death in 1915. One month after Kyoda started, Miyagi Chōjun (co-founder of Gōjū-ryū) entered the dojo. In 1908, Kenwa Mabuni (founder of Shitō-ryū) also joined the dojo of Higaonna Kanryō.

In 1934 Kyoda received his Kyoshi license from the Dai Nippon Butoku Kai.

Apparently Kyoda knew two versions of Seisan: one from Higaonna Kanryō and one from Higaonna Kan-yu, but only passed on the Kan-yu version. He learned Jion from Kentsū Yabu and Nepai from Go Kenki. By far Higaonna Kanryō had the most profound impact on him as Kyoda devoted well over a decade of his life to learning Kanryō's karate. He ultimately named his style after him: Tō-on-ryū (literally 'Higaon[na] style').

Tōon-ryū's curriculum includes Taiso — a set of preparatory exercises that includes warming up, stretching, push ups using knuckles and feet fingers, abs etc. and Kihon — a set of basic blocking, punching, kicking and striking as well as standing and in motion.

Katas 
Kihon 1: Kata made by Kyoda Juhatsu
Kihon 2: Kata made by Kyoda Juhatsu
Sanchin
Shiho-uke/Tsuki-uke: "Receiving from four directions" or "Punching & Blocking", kata made by Kanzaki Juwa, includes basic blocking, turning, punching and kicking, hard to be mastered, a starting point to learn advanced Tōon-ryū Kata;
Kan'yu Seisan: Kata taught to Kyoda Juhatsu by Higaonna Kanryo's older cousin, Higaonna Kan'yu (differs from other Okinawan Seisan)
Sanseru: Kata of Kanryo Higaonna
Kowa (Kihon 3): Kata made by Kyoda Juko and Kanzaki Juwa senseis. Name comes from the Kanji of the names of Kyoda Juko (KO) and Kanzaki Juwa (WA) senseis. Kata includes multiple kicking techniques, namely mae geri, mawashi geri, yoko geri, ushiro geri and nidan geri. A kata embusen used to prepare karateka to learn Yabu no Jion Kata
Yabu Jion: Kata passed down by Yabu Kentsu sensei, adopted to Tōon-ryū
P/Becchurin: Kata of Kanryo Higaonna, verbatim "100 continuous steps" and differs from Goju-ryu Suparimpei "108"
Neipai: Kata retains Chinese flavour (possibly learned by Kyoda Juhatsu from Go Kenki but current soke doubts it because it differs a lot from Shito-Ryu's Nipaipo kata that was definitely learned from Go Kenki)

Kumite 
Ippon Kumite: one punch kumite
Nihon Kumite: two punch kumite
Sanbon kumite: three punch kumite
Kakede: Kumite starting from pushing hands
Bunkai: How to use a kata in a self defense situation

Kobudo Kata weapon list 
Tsuken Shitahaku no Sai: Kata for the weapon Sai
Chatan Yara no Sai: Kata for the weapon Sai
Sueyoshi no Kon: Kata as taught by Kyoda Juhatsu
Nunchaku

Additional exercises 
Rokkishu: A set of hand techniques similar to Goju-Ryu Tensho Kata and Uechi-Ryu Kanchin Kata. Opposite to the popular opinion it is not a kata;
Ten-i-happo: A set of evasions in eight directions, made by Kyoda Juhatsu, with receiving attacks, continued by counterattacks, includes pushing an opponent of balance followed by low circular foot sweep;
Ude Kitae: arms conditioning, preceding kumite
Ashi Kitae: legs conditioning, preceding kumite

Kyoda's tradition was carried on by Iraha Choko (1901–1986), Kyoda Juko (3rd son; 1926–1983), Onishi Eizo (1932–), Murakami Katsumi (1927–) and Kanzaki Juwa (重和) (1928–2018). Kanzaki gave teaching licenses to Yoshino Jusei (重正) (1937–2017), Fujishima Jusho (重捷), and Ikeda Jusshu (重秀). Tōon-ryū have some dojo in Japan.
Yoshino's branch Shido-kai in Fukuoka. Onishi's branch Kouei-kan in Tokyo. Murakami's branch Shorin-kan in Fukuoka.
Ikeda Jusshu is the current Yondai Soke of Tōon-ryū (4th generation head of the school) still teaches karate in Beppu, Ōita.

Information about Tōon-ryū in the Western world appears mainly due to the efforts of the Karate researchers Pavel Demyanov (Russia). Pavel Demyanov studied under Ikeda Jusshu (Shigehide) and learned the entire Tōon-ryū curriculum, including Kobudo, and has permission to teach.

References

External links
 Tōon-ryū home page (Japanese)
 Interview with the current Tōon-ryū Soke
 Tōon-ryū Honbu Dojo Website
 Japanese Wikipedia page (Tōon-ryū)
 Japanese Wikipedia page (kanzaki kazuya (kanzaki juuwa=Kanzaki Shigekazu))
 The meeting of Okinawan karate masters in 1936

Okinawan karate
Traditional karate
Japanese martial arts
Gōjū-ryū